Real Santa Barbara was a former soccer team. The name real, meaning royal, came from Spanish teams (as in Real Madrid), just like current MLS club Real Salt Lake. The club played in the city of Santa Barbara, California. It was active for the 1989 season in the Western Soccer League and the 1990 season in the American Professional Soccer League.

Coaches
 Andy Kuenzli (1989)
 Valery Volostnykh (1990)

Former players
 Tim Vom Steeg (1989–90)

Year-by-year

References 

Defunct soccer clubs in California
Soccer clubs in California
Sports in Santa Barbara, California
Western Soccer Alliance teams
American Professional Soccer League teams
1989 establishments in California
1990 disestablishments in California
Association football clubs established in 1989
Association football clubs disestablished in 1990